Mala Vas is a roadside village on the left bank of the Drava River east of Ptuj in northeastern Slovenia. It lies in the Municipality of Gorišnica. The area traditionally belonged to the Styria region. It is now included in the Drava Statistical Region.

Area chapels
There are two small chapel-shrines in the settlement, one dating to 1885 and the other to 1921.

References

External links
Mala Vas on Geopedia

Populated places in the Municipality of Gorišnica